Štěpán Hřebejk (born May 28, 1982 in Strakonice) is a Czech professional ice hockey player. He is currently a free agent having last played for HC David Servis České Budějovice of the 2nd Czech Republic Hockey League.

Hřebejk played 603 games in the Czech Extraliga, playing for HC České Budějovice, Vsetínská hokejová, HC Karlovy Vary and Piráti Chomutov. He also played in the Tipsport Liga for HC Nové Zámky.

References

External links

1982 births
Living people
Czech ice hockey forwards
HC Karlovy Vary players
Motor České Budějovice players
HC Nové Zámky players
People from Strakonice
Piráti Chomutov players
IHC Písek players
HC Tábor players
VHK Vsetín players
Sportspeople from the South Bohemian Region
Czech expatriate ice hockey players in Slovakia